Shao Fang Sheng (September 13, 1917 – April 22, 2009) is a well-known Chinese artist who is also one of the few apprentices of Frank Lloyd Wright. Olgivanna Lloyd-Wright thoughts on Shao Fangsheng, “made friends with unmatched speed and always with those she could profit by most.”

Biography

Early life
Shao came from a well-known industrial family that had their roots in Changzhou, Jiangsu province, China. She was born and raised during the overthrow of the Qing dynasty and the founding of the Republic of China.

She was a very athletic in her youth, representing her city Tianjin, as a short stop and nationally in softball as a teenager.

Career
Upon arrival to the United States, she stayed with Frank Lloyd Wright and Olgivanna Lloyd Wright, where she cooked and entertained guests including John Wayne, James Stewart and other actors and socialites. She taught Mandarin to John King Fairbank, a well-known scholar from Harvard University, in the American Embassy, Nanjing. Furthermore, her ability to paint with watercolours was noticed by several well-known painting masters, and she was commissioned by the Nationalist Government of China, to duplicate the fresco within the Bezeklik Thousand Buddha Caves, situated in the Taklamakan Desert, China. Her late husband Sheng Pao Sheng was also an apprentice of Frank Lloyd Wright and a respected architect.

References

External links 
Additional information from www.rickspeckwritings.com

1917 births
2009 deaths
Artists from Changzhou
Chinese softball players
Sportspeople from Changzhou
Chinese expatriates in the United States